The Temple Riders is a Mormon motorcycle club founded in 1987.

There are over 750 members in chapters spread out to  many states and few countries.

See also
Bikers for Christ

References

External links
 http://www.templeriders.org/
 Video: Temple Riders Rough Cut - Vimeo

Latter Day Saint organizations
Motorcycle clubs in the United States
Organizations established in 1987